Qanbarabad (also Romanized as Qanbarābād) is a village in Howmeh Rural District, in the Central District of Gonabad County, Razavi Khorasan Province, Iran. At the 2006 census, its population was 1,720, in 500 families.

References 

Populated places in Gonabad County